Cynaeda allardalis is a moth in the family Crambidae. It was described by Oberthür in 1876. It is found in Algeria.

References

Moths described in 1876
Odontiini